Temple Beth Israel is a Reform synagogue located at 892 Cherry Street in Macon, Georgia. Formed in 1859 by Jews of German background as Congregation Kahal Kadosh Beth Israel, it was originally Orthodox, and followed the German minhag.

The congregation constructed its first building on the corner of Poplar and Second Streets from 1871 to 1874. The congregation's current building was constructed on the corner of Cherry and Spring Streets in 1902.

, the rabbi was Larry Schlesinger. Rabbi Larry Schlesinger retired in June 2017 and is honored with Emeritus status. He is succeeded by Rabbi Aaron Sataloff.

Notes

Further reading
 Friedman, Newton J. A History of Temple Beth Israel of Macon, Georgia 1859-1955, Temple Beth Israel of Macon, Georgia Macon, Georgia, 1990.

External links
Temple Beth Israel website

19th-century synagogues
German-American culture in Georgia (U.S. state)
German-Jewish culture in the United States
Synagogues completed in 1902
Buildings and structures in Macon, Georgia
Neoclassical synagogues
Reform synagogues in Georgia (U.S. state)
Religious organizations established in 1859
Synagogues in Georgia (U.S. state)
1859 establishments in Georgia (U.S. state)